Garazi Murua Astorkiza (born 24 January 1995) is a Spanish footballer who plays as a defender for Athletic Club, where she is the captain.

Club career
Murua started her career in Bizkerre's academy. In 2014 she spent one semester in the United States playing with the ETSU Buccaneers (East Tennessee State University) as part of a degree in economics she was undertaking at the University of the Basque Country. Soon after returning to Bilbao, she made her Primera División debut for Athletic, and in her first full season – 2015–16 – the club finished as national champions.

A back injury sustained before the start of the 2022–23 season caused her to miss most of the campaign.

References

External links
 
 
 
 
 Garazi Murua on LinkedIn

 

1995 births
Living people
Women's association football defenders
Spanish women's footballers
Athletic Club Femenino players
Primera División (women) players
Footballers from Getxo
Spanish expatriate women's footballers
Expatriate women's soccer players in the United States
Spanish expatriate sportspeople in the United States
East Tennessee State Buccaneers women's soccer players
East Tennessee State University alumni
University of the Basque Country alumni
Athletic Club Femenino B players
Spain women's youth international footballers